Dilonchus pictus is a species of beetles in the family Carabidae, the only species in the genus Dilonchus.

References

Licininae
Monotypic Carabidae genera
Beetles described in 1963